Hydrogenase (NAD+, ferredoxin) (bifurcating [FeFe] hydrogenase) is an enzyme with systematic name hydrogen:NAD+, ferredoxin oxidoreductase. This enzyme catalyses the following chemical reaction

 2 H2 + NAD+ + 2 oxidized ferredoxin  5 H+ + NADH + 2 reduced ferredoxin

The enzyme from Thermotoga maritima contains a [Fe-Fe] cluster (H-cluster) and iron-sulfur clusters. I

References

External links 
 

EC 1.12.1